Yoon Na-moo (born August 13, 1985) is a South Korean actor under SM C&C. He is best known for his roles in the Korean television series Dr. Romantic (2016) and Dr. Romantic 2 (2020).

Early life
Yoon was born on August 13, 1985 in Seoul, South Korea. He graduated from Dongguk University.

Filmography

Television series

Web series

Theater

Awards and nominations

References

External links
 Yoon Na-moo at SM C&C
 Yoon Na-moo at HanCinema

1985 births
Living people
South Korean male television actors
21st-century South Korean male actors